Söderköpings IS was a sports club in Söderköping, Sweden, established 12 December 1917. The bandy team played in the Swedish top division in 1942 losing all five league games. In 1950 the club won the bandy district championship. The soccer team has played in the Swedish fourth division.

On 15 January 2004 the club merged with IK Ramunder, leading to the establishment of Söderköpings IK.

References 

1917 establishments in Sweden
2004 establishments in Sweden
Defunct bandy clubs in Sweden
Defunct football clubs in Sweden
Sport in Östergötland County
Sports clubs established in 1917
Sports clubs disestablished in 2004